The 1990 Stockholm Open was a men's tennis tournament played on indoor carpet courts. It was the 22nd edition of the Stockholm Open and was part of the ATP Super 9 of the 1990 ATP Tour. It took place at the Stockholm Globe Arena in Stockholm, Sweden, from 22 October through 29 October 1990.

The singles draw was headlined by world No. 1, Wimbledon champion, Los Angeles, New Haven, Indian Wells, Cincinnati titlist Stefan Edberg, Brussels, Indianapolis, Stuttgart indoor winner, Wimbledon runner-up Boris Becker and Key Biscayne, San Francisco, Washington champion, French Open, US Open finalist Andre Agassi. Other top seeds were US Open, Manchester winner Pete Sampras, French Open, Barcelona champion Andrés Gómez, Emilio Sánchez, Brad Gilbert and John McEnroe.

Finals

Singles

 Boris Becker defeated  Stefan Edberg, 6–4, 6–0, 6–3
 It was Becker's 5th singles title of the year, and the 29th of his career. It was his 1st Masters title.

Doubles

 Guy Forget /  Jakob Hlasek defeated  John Fitzgerald /  Anders Järryd, 6–4, 6–2

References

External links
 
 ATP tournament profile
 ITF tournament edition details

 
Stock